Shaila Rani Rawat is a member of Bharatiya Janata Party from Delhi. She served as member of the Vidhan Sabha representing Kedarnath. She was elected from Kedarnath in 2012 state elections in Uttarakhand.  She was a member of the Indian National Congress until she joined Bharatiya Janata Party in the aftermath of Uttarakhand political crisis.

Shaila Rani Rawat was elected as the member of Uttarakhand Legislative Assembly from Bhartiya Janata Party in 2022 Uttarakhand Legislative Assembly election and defeated Manoj Rawat of Indian National Congress by 9329 votes.

References

People from Rudraprayag district
1957 births
Living people
Bharatiya Janata Party politicians from Uttarakhand
Uttarakhand MLAs 2022–2027
Indian National Congress politicians
Uttarakhand MLAs 2012–2017